Naum Torbov (1880-1952) was a Bulgarian architect.

Biography
Torbov was born on 18 November 1880 in Gopesh village in the Ottoman Macedonia. His family emigrated to the Principality of Bulgaria and settled in the town of Oryahovo. Naum enrolled in architecture at the National University of Arts in Bucharest, Romania, and he graduated in 1904. After the studies he came back to Bulgaria and started working at the Ministry of Public Buildings and Roads. In 1906 Torbov was appointed to the post of head of the department of architecture by the Sofia municipality. In 1908 he started his private practice.

Naum Torbov was a follower of the national romantic stream in architecture. More than a hundred public, residential and industrial buildings are constructed by his projects in the towns of Sofia, Oryahovo, Silistra, Botevgrad, Mezdra.

Works

Amidst the most famous buildings by him are:
Hotel Continental
Hotel Paris
Hentovi house - Knyaz Boris I str. 135, Sofia (1906)
Stanishevi house - Miladinovi brothers str. 27, Sofia (1909)
Masonry edifice - Hristo Botev blvd 71 (1910)
Sofia Central Market Hall - Knyaginya Marie Louise blvd, Sofia (1911)
Dimitar Kostov's edifice - Alabin str. 36, Sofia (1914)
Romanian institute - Exarch Joseph str., Sofia (1933)

References
Sofia Culture - a Sofia Municipality Site
Bulgarian Romantic Secession 
Sofia City Municipality Official Site

External links
Naum Torbov article

Bulgarian architects
1880 births
1952 deaths
People from Bitola
20th-century Bulgarian architects
Bulgarian people of Aromanian descent